Ipswich Hockey Club is a field hockey club based at the Ipswich Sports Club in Henley Road, Ipswich, Suffolk with matchday fixtures held at Tuddenham Road.  The club runs five women's teams, four men's teams and a number of junior teams.

The women's first X1 play in the East Women's League  and the men's first X1 play in the East Men's League 

The women's team has gained significant honours -
 1992-93 National League Champions
 Seven times National League Runner-up
 1984-85 Cup Champions
 1995-96 Cup Champions
 2001-02 Cup Champions

Notable players

Women's internationals

References

English field hockey clubs